Humibacter soli is a Gram-positive, short rod-shaped and non-motile bacterium from the genus Humibacter which has been isolated from soil.

References

External links
Type strain of Humibacter soli at BacDive -  the Bacterial Diversity Metadatabase

Microbacteriaceae
Bacteria described in 2016